Vietor Rock is a rock linked by a spit to Nikopol Point on the south coast of Byers Peninsula, Livingston Island in the South Shetland Islands, Antarctica.  The area was visited by early 19th century sealers operating on Byers Peninsula.

The feature is named after Alexander O. Vietor, Curator of Maps, Yale University Library, who discovered the original logbooks of the American sealing vessels Hersilia, 1819–20, and Huron, 1820–21.

Location

See also 
 Composite Antarctic Gazetteer
 List of Antarctic islands south of 60° S
 SCAR
 Territorial claims in Antarctica

Maps
 Península Byers, Isla Livingston. Mapa topográfico a escala 1:25000. Madrid: Servicio Geográfico del Ejército, 1992.
 L.L. Ivanov. Antarctica: Livingston Island and Greenwich, Robert, Snow and Smith Islands. Scale 1:120000 topographic map.  Troyan: Manfred Wörner Foundation, 2009.

References

External links
Composite Antarctic Gazetteer.

Rock formations of Livingston Island